The 78 is a development in Chicago that will consist of several office and residential towers, high-rises, and will also include a riverwalk. The name "The 78" refers to the existing 77 community areas in Chicago and the mega-development is to increase that number by one. Related Midwest will develop the site, and Skidmore, Owings & Merrill designed the project's master plan. Related Midwest acquired the land in 2016.

The 78 development will be located on a 62-acre parcel of land just south of Downtown Chicago and north of Chinatown.  The area is bordered by Roosevelt Road to the north, Clark Street to the east, 16th Street to the south, and the South Branch of the Chicago River to the west.

The 78 will also include a $1.2 billion research center called the Discovery Partners Institute, which will be operated by the University of Illinois.

In April 2019, the Chicago City Council approved The 78 development, including a tax increment financing agreement.

Several other mega and large-scale projects are also underway in Chicago. These include Lincoln Yards, 400 Lake Shore Drive, Tribune East Tower, One Chicago, Southbank, Riverline, Bronzeville Lakefront, an $8.5 billion revamp of O'Hare International Airport, a city casino, an extension of the Red Line subway/elevated train, and the Barack Obama Presidential Center among other large scale projects. One Central is another mega-development that has been proposed southeast of The 78 near Soldier Field.

In 2021, it was proposed to put a Rivers Casino in The 78 as part of the Chicago Casino Proposals, but the city selected a site in the River West district near the intersection of Chicago Avenue and Halsted Street for a casino and entertainment complex.

History
Much of the land was created through landfills in the 1920s as part of a $9 million realignment of the South Branch Chicago River. The area then became a railyard for trains traveling to or from either the Grand Central station or LaSalle Street station. The railyard was eventually demolished in the 1970s, forming a 62-acre vacant lot. The former railyard remained in limbo for decades. In 2001, Tony Rezko bought the entire land for mixed-use development. His plan did not come to fruition and eventually sold the land in 2005.

References

Buildings and structures in Chicago
Multi-building developments in Chicago
Buildings developed by the Related Companies